The Economic History Association (EHA) was founded in 1940 to "encourage and promote teaching, research, and publication on every phase of economic history and to help preserve and administer materials for research in economic history". It publishes The Journal of Economic History with  the Cambridge University Press, holds an annual meeting that usually takes place in September, and awards prizes and grants.  It is also the home to the EH.Net Encyclopedia of Economic and Business History.

Membership 
There are more than 1,000 EHA members worldwide, and composed of faculty and graduate students from universities around the world, as well as economists in the private sector and in government.

Michael Haupert of the University of Wisconsin-La Crosse is the Executive Director, and John Wallis is the President. Previous EHA Presidents include Oxford's Robert C. Allen, Vanderbilt's Jeremy Atack, UC Berkeley's Barry Eichengreen, Yale's Naomi Lamoreaux, as well as Economics Nobel Laureates Robert Fogel and Douglass North.

Prizes and grants 
The Economic History Association supports research through Arthur H. Cole grants-in-aid and awards prizes for publications, dissertations, and teaching, as well as fellowships and grants for students of economic history.

It awards several prizes for publications:
 Arthur Cole Prize: best article published in The Journal of Economic History each year
 Alice Hanson Jones prize: for the best book published biennially in American economic history
 Gyorgi Ranki prize: best book published biennially in non-American economic history
 Allan Nevins prize: best dissertation on American or Canadian economic history, awarded on behalf of Columbia University Press
 Alexander Gerschenkron prize: best dissertation in non-American economic history
 Jonathan Hughes Prize: for superior teaching
 Engerman-Goldin Prize: biennial prize for contributions to economic history made in the previous five years. It is the EHA's newest award and whose first award will be disbursed in 2018.

The society also provides grants to support the early stages of dissertation work in economic history and fellowships to support students finishing their dissertations on the topic. Two Kenneth Sokoloff fellowships are awarded by the EHA each year to students finishing their dissertations in economic history.

Annual conferences 
EHA's annual conference is held each September in North America. The 2018 meeting took place in Montreal, with the theme "‘From Plague, Famine, and War, Save us, O Lord’ Shocks and Disasters in Economic History". The 2019 conference in Atlanta was themed "Markets and Governments in Economic History." According to the normal schedule submissions for consideration for the 2020 conference will be due in January 2020.

In partnership with American Economic Association, EHA has designated sessions at the annual ASSA conference each January.

References 

Historical societies of the United States
Professional associations based in the United States
Economic history societies
History of business
Organizations based in Wisconsin